The following is a list of evolutionary psychology research groups and centers.

Psychology lists
Evolutionary psychology
Cognitive science lists
Research groups